

Champions

French Championships
The French Championships tennis tournament began in 1891 but women's doubles didn't make an appearance until 1907. The tournament was open only to French citizens and permanent residents through 1924, but beginning in 1925, the French Championships became an international event open to all nationalities.

French Open

Statistics

Champions by country

If the doubles partners are from the same country then that country gets two titles instead of one, while if they are from different countries then each country will get one title apiece.

See also

French Open other competitions
List of French Open men's singles champions
List of French Open men's doubles champions 
List of French Open women's singles champions
List of French Open mixed doubles champions

Grand Slam women's doubles
List of Australian Open women's doubles champions
List of Wimbledon ladies' doubles champions
List of US Open women's doubles champions
List of Grand Slam women's doubles champions

Notes

References

women
French Open
Open
French Open